This national electoral calendar for 2017 lists the national/federal elections held in 2017 in all sovereign states and their dependent territories. By-elections are excluded, though national referendums are included.

January
5 November – 17 January: Somalia, 
23–31 January: Tokelau, Legislature
29 January: Haiti,  and

February
5 February: Liechtenstein, Parliament
12 February: 
Switzerland, Referendums
Turkmenistan, President
19 February: Ecuador, President (1st round), Parliament and Referendum
20 February: Nagorno-Karabakh, 
21 February: Marshall Islands, Constitutional Convention

March
7 March: Federated States of Micronesia, Parliament and Referendum
12 March: Abkhazia, Parliament (1st round)
15 March: Netherlands, House of Representatives
19 March: 
Saint Barthélemy, Legislature
Saint Martin, Legislature (1st round)
Saint Pierre and Miquelon, Legislature
20 March: East Timor, President
26 March: 
Abkhazia, Parliament (2nd round)
Bulgaria, Parliament
Saint Martin, Legislature (2nd round)
Wallis and Futuna, Legislature

April
2 April: 
Armenia, Parliament
Ecuador, President (2nd round)
Serbia, President
6 April: The Gambia, Parliament
9 April: South Ossetia, President and Referendum
16 April: Turkey, Constitutional Referendum
23 April: France, President (1st round)
28 April: Curaçao, Legislature

May
4 May: Algeria, National Assembly
6 May: Niue, Legislature
7 May: France, President (2nd round)
9 May: South Korea, President
10 May: The Bahamas, House of Assembly
19 May: Iran, President
21 May: Switzerland, Referendum
24 May: Cayman Islands, Legislature

June
3 June: 
Lesotho, National Assembly
Malta, Parliament
8 June: United Kingdom, House of Commons
11 June: 
France, National Assembly (1st round)
Kosovo, Parliament
Puerto Rico, Referendum
18 June: France, National Assembly (2nd round)
24 June – 8 July: Papua New Guinea, Parliament
25 June: Albania, Parliament
26 June: Mongolia, President (1st round)

July
7 July: Mongolia, President (2nd round)
16 July: 
Republic of the Congo, National Assembly (1st round)
Venezuela, Referendum
18 July: Bermuda, House of Assembly
22 July: East Timor, Parliament
30 July: 
Republic of the Congo, National Assembly (2nd round)
Senegal, Parliament
Venezuela, Constituent Assembly

August
4 August: Rwanda, President
5 August: Mauritania, Constitutional Referendum
8 August: Kenya, President (election nullified), National Assembly and Senate
23 August: Angola, Parliament (1st phase)
26 August: Angola, Parliament (2nd phase)

September
11 September: Norway, Parliament
12 September – 7 November: Australia, Referendum
17 September: Macau, Legislature
22 September: Aruba, Legislature
23 September: New Zealand, Parliament
24 September: 
Germany, Bundestag
Slovenia, Referendum
Switzerland, Referendums

October
10 October: Liberia, President (1st round) and House of Representatives
15 October: 
Austria, National Council
Kyrgyzstan, President
20–21 October: Czech Republic, Chamber of Deputies
22 October: 
Argentina, Chamber of Deputies and Senate
Japan, House of Representatives and 
Slovenia, President (1st round)
26 October: Kenya, President (re-vote)
28 October: Iceland, Parliament

November
8 November: Pitcairn Islands, Deputy Mayor and Legislature
9 November: Falkland Islands, Legislature
12 November: 
Equatorial Guinea, Chamber of Deputies and Senate
Slovenia, President (2nd round)
13 November: Somaliland, President
16 November: Tonga, Parliament
19 November: Chile, President (1st round), Chamber of Deputies and Senate
26 November: 
Honduras, President and Parliament
Nepal, House of Representatives (1st phase)

December
3 December: Bolivia, 
7 December: Nepal, House of Representatives (2nd phase)
17 December: Chile, President (2nd round)
26 December: Liberia, President (2nd round)

Indirect elections
The following indirect elections of heads of state and the upper houses of bicameral legislatures took place through votes in elected lower houses, unicameral legislatures, or electoral colleges: 
8 February: Somalia, President
12 February: Germany, President
13 March: Hungary, President
26 March: Hong Kong, Chief Executive
1 April: San Marino, Captains Regent
19, 20, 27 and 28 April: Albania, President
21 April, 14 May, 11 July, 15 August, 9 and 29 November: Malaysia, Senate
28 June: Kazakhstan, Senate
3–6 July: Vanuatu, President
5 July: Samoa, Head of State
17 July: India, President
19 July: Artsakh, President
21 July and 8 August: India, Council of States
31 July: Republic of the Congo, 
24 September: France, Senate
1 October: San Marino, Captains Regent
22–23 November: Slovenia, National Council

See also
2017 in politics

References

National
National
Political timelines of the 2010s by year
National